Charles Parkhurst may refer to:

Charles Henry Parkhurst (1842–1933), American clergyman and social reformer
Charles Percy Parkhurst (1913–2008), American museum curator who recovered works stolen by Nazis
Charley Parkhurst (1812–1879), American transgender stagecoach driver and settler